The New York Islanders are an American professional ice hockey team based in Elmont, New York. They play in the Metropolitan Division of the Eastern Conference in the National Hockey League (NHL). The team joined the NHL in 1972, and won their first Stanley Cup championship in 1980. The Islanders play their home games at UBS Arena in Elmont. Jon Ledecky and Scott D. Malkin are the Islanders' majority owners, Lou Lamoriello is their general manager, Lane Lambert is the head coach and Anders Lee is the team captain.

There have been 17 head coaches so far for the Islanders franchise. The team's first head coach was Phil Goyette, who coached the team for part of the 1972–73 season. Al Arbour is the franchise's all-time leader for the most regular season games coached (1,500) and the most regular season game wins (740); he is also the franchise's all-time leader for the most playoff games coached (198), and the most playoff game wins (119). Arbour is the only coach so far to have been inducted into the Hockey Hall of Fame. He and Trotz are the only coaches so far to have won the Jack Adams Award as the NHL's top coach. The franchise has participated in the Stanley Cup finals five times so far, coached by Arbour each time; they won Stanley Cup four of those times. Arbour, Terry Simpson, Peter Laviolette, Steve Stirling, Ted Nolan, Jack Capuano, and Barry Trotz are the coaches who coached the team into the Stanley Cup playoffs.

Key

Coaches

Note: Statistics are correct through the 2021–22 season.

Notes
  A running total of the number of coaches of the Islanders. Thus, any coach who has two or more separate terms as head coach is only counted once.
  Before the 2005–06 season, the NHL instituted a penalty shootout for regular season games that remained tied after a five-minute overtime period, which prevented ties.
  In hockey, the winning percentage is calculated by dividing points by maximum possible points.
  Each year is linked to an article about that particular NHL season.
  Arbour replaced Ted Nolan as an interim head coach for one game in order to have coached 1500 Islanders games.

References
General
 

Specific

New York Islanders coaches
New York Islanders head coaches
Head coaches